Hoseynabad (also Romanized as Ḩoseynābād) is a village in Baghestan Rural District, in the Central District of Bavanat County, Fars Province, Iran. At the 2006 census, its population was 22, in 4 families.

References 

Populated places in Bavanat County